The London and North Eastern Railway (LNER) Thompson Class Q1 was a class of 0-8-0T steam locomotives. They were rebuilds of the GCR Class 8A (LNER Class Q4) 0-8-0s. Thirteen were rebuilt between 1942 and 1945 at Gorton Works. All passed to British Railways in 1948, numbered 69925–69937.

Overview
The locomotives had outside cylinders with inside valves and inside Stephenson valve gear. There were two variants:

 Q1/1 (69925-69928) with  tanks
 Q1/2 (69929-69937) with  tanks

The extra  of water in the Q1/2 was carried in the rear tank, under the coal bunker, resulting in a reduced coal capacity.

Withdrawal
All the Class Q1 locomotives were withdrawn and scrapped from 1954 to 1959.

References

Further reading 

 Willie Yeadon Yeadon's Register of LNER locomotives Vol 20: Class Q1, Q2, Q3 & Q4, & The Q1 Tank

Sources

Q01
0-8-0T locomotives
Railway locomotives introduced in 1942
Standard gauge steam locomotives of Great Britain
Scrapped locomotives
Freight locomotives